Pidvolochysk Raion was a raion in Ternopil Oblast in western Ukraine. Its administrative center was the urban-type settlement of Pidvolochysk. The raion was abolished on 18 July 2020 as part of the administrative reform of Ukraine, which reduced the number of raions of Ternopil Oblast to three. The area of Pidvolochysk Raion was merged into Ternopil Raion. The last estimate of the raion population was 

At the time of disestablishment, the raion consisted of three hromadas:
 Pidvolochysk settlement hromada with the administration in Pidvolochysk;
 Skalat urban hromada with the administration in the city of Skalat;
 Skoryky rural hromada with the administration in the selo of Skoryky.

See also
 Subdivisions of Ukraine

References

Former raions of Ternopil Oblast
1939 establishments in Ukraine
Ukrainian raions abolished during the 2020 administrative reform